This is a list of qualifying teams for the 2011 NCAA Division I men's basketball tournament. A total of 68 teams entered the tournament, an increase of three from the prior season with introduction of the opening round "First Four". Thirty of the teams earned automatic bids by winning their conference tournaments. The automatic bid of the Ivy League, which did not conduct a postseason tournament, went to its regular season champion. The remaining 37 teams were granted at-large bids, which were extended by the NCAA Selection Committee. All teams were seeded within their assigned region from 1 to 16, which was disclosed, while the Selection Committee seeded the entire field from 1 to 68, which was not disclosed.

Team names used below are consistent with ESPN.com scoreboards and individual team pages on Wikipedia.

Automatic bids 
Automatic bids to the tournament were granted for winning a conference championship tournament, except for the automatic bid of the Ivy League given to the regular season champion (though Princeton and Harvard were required to break a tie with a one-game playoff). Seeds listed were seeds within the conference tournaments. Runners-up in bold face were given at-large berths.

At-large bids

Listed by region and seeding 

*See First Four.

Bids by conference

Bids by state

References

NCAA Division I men's basketball tournament qualifying teams
 
qualifying teams